Diana Khristova Koleva-Tsvetanova (née Koleva, ; born 24 October 1959) is a former Bulgarian badminton player. She competed in three consecutive Summer Olympics in 1992 Barcelona, 1996 Atlanta, and 2000 Sydney. Koleva won sixteen times the National Championships title from 1985 to 2003. She also won the women's singles title at the 1988/89 season of European Circuit.

Achievements

IBF International Challenge/Series 
Women's singles

Women's doubles

Mixed doubles

References

External links
 
 
 
 

1959 births
Living people
Sportspeople from Sofia
Bulgarian female badminton players
Olympic badminton players of Bulgaria
Badminton players at the 2000 Summer Olympics
Badminton players at the 1996 Summer Olympics
Badminton players at the 1992 Summer Olympics